The HomePod Mini (stylized as HomePod mini) is a smart speaker developed by Apple Inc. The HomePod Mini was released on November 16, 2020. Roughly a 10 cm (4-inch) sphere, it was released as a smaller and less expensive version of Apple's HomePod.

Overview 
The HomePod Mini is based on the Apple S5 system in a package also used for the Apple Watch Series 5 and SE. It improves Continuity and Handoff integration, enables Siri to recognize up to six people's voices and personalizing responses to each one, and adds the Intercom feature — also available on iPhones, iPads, and Apple Watches — enabling users with more than one HomePod to communicate with each other in different rooms.

HomePod Mini's wireless capabilities include 802.11n Wi-Fi, Bluetooth 5, and an ultra-wideband chip for device proximity and AirPlay Handoff. It supports the Thread network protocol, supported by the Connected Home over IP working group. It has a non-detachable USB-C cable and comes with a 20W power adapter.

With the release of audioOS 14.3 in late 2020, HomePod Mini gained support for 18W power adapters, which made it compatible with third-party adapters and portable power banks.

It is designed to operate at temperatures from 32° to 95 °F (0° to 35 °C); at relative humidity between 5% to 90% (noncondensing); and at altitudes up to 10,000 feet (3000 m). Following its launch, teardowns found a temperature and humidity sensor that was unannounced by Apple. Humidity and temperature sensing was activated following the 16.3 software update in January 2023, after these sensors were added to the second-generation full-sized HomePod.

It is compatible with devices running iOS 14 and iPadOS 14 and later. tvOS 15 allows the Apple TV to use HomePod Mini as a speaker, supporting a stereo pair.

On October 18, 2021, Apple announced that the existing gray and white options would be joined by blue, orange, and yellow versions. The new colors have a tinted touch display that is a lighter hue of the body color, and the braided cable is also colored accordingly.

Sales 
Apple sold an estimated 4.6 million smart speakers in Q4 2020, representing sales of both the HomePod mini and original HomePod. The HomePod Mini sold an estimated 2.18 million units in Q1 2021, representing 91% of Apple's smart speaker sales, along with the original HomePod. It sold an estimated 2.5 million units worldwide in Q2 2021, and 4 million units in Q3. It sold an estimated 4.5 million units in Q1 2022 and was the top selling individual smart speaker.

Operating system

Comparison with other models

References

Apple Inc. hardware
Products introduced in 2020
Smart speakers